Lovece is a surname. Notable people with the surname include:

Fabiana Lovece (born 1972), Argentinian biathlete
Frank Lovece (born 1958), American journalist and writer
Frank Lovece (1956–2018), Australian musician, filmmaker, and poet
Natalia Lovece (born 1978), Argentinian biathlete.
Ron LoVece (1939–2010), American fashion designer